Lake Muskoka/Alport Bay Water Aerodrome  is located  southwest of Bracebridge, Ontario, Canada.

See also
 List of airports in the Bracebridge area

References

Registered aerodromes in Ontario
Transport in Bracebridge, Ontario
Seaplane bases in Ontario